Rouffigny is a former commune in the Manche department in Normandy in north-western France. On 1 January 2016, it was merged into the new commune of Villedieu-les-Poêles-Rouffigny.

See also
Communes of the Manche department

References 

Former communes of Manche